Mukhur may refer to:

 Yujiulü Mugulü, former of the Rouran Khaganate, also known as Mukhur.
 Mokhor, Showt, a village in Qarah Quyun-e Jonubi Rural District